The Statute Law (Repeals) Act 1975 (c 10) is an Act of the Parliament of the United Kingdom.

This Act was partly in force in Great Britain at the end of 2010.

It implemented recommendations contained in the sixth report on statute law revision, by the Law Commission and the Scottish Law Commission.

Section 1
Sections 1(1) and (3) were repealed by Group 1 of Part IX of Schedule 1 to the Statute Law (Repeals) Act 1998.

Section 2
Section 2(2) was repealed by Group 1 of Part IX of Schedule 1 to the Statute Law (Repeals) Act 1998.

Schedule
The Schedule was repealed by Group 1 of Part IX of Schedule 1 to the Statute Law (Repeals) Act 1998.

See also
Statute Law (Repeals) Act

References
Halsbury's Statutes. Fourth Edition. 2008 Reissue. Volume 41. Page 791.
Peter Allsop (General editor). Current Law Statutes Annotated 1975. Sweet & Maxwell, Stevens & sons. London. W Green & son. Edinburgh. 1975. Volume 1.
The Public General Acts and General Synod Measures 1975. HMSO. London. 1976. Part I. Page 249.
HL Deb vol 354, col 1500, vol 355, cols 540 to 541, vol 357, col 996, HC Deb vol 888, cols 462 to 467.

United Kingdom Acts of Parliament 1975